The Channel Islands Universities Consortium (CHUC) was launched in September 1993. CHUC seeks to strengthen the relationship between the Bailiwicks of Guernsey and Jersey, and It aims to promote the opportunities available within higher education to students from the islands. Its current members are University of Brighton, Bournemouth University, University of Plymouth and finally the University of Portsmouth  University representatives from CHUC visit the islands regularly to talk to interested students of both islands in groups and individually about the options available.

References

Universities Consortium
1993 establishments in Guernsey
1993 establishments in Jersey
College and university associations and consortia in Europe
Organizations established in 1993